Britt is an unincorporated area in Saint Louis County, Minnesota, United States.

Britt is located 11 miles north of the city of Virginia.

The original center of Britt was generally considered at the intersection of Saint Louis County Road 68 and Jarvinen Road (County 662) in the southwest corner of Sandy Township.  Britt Creek flows through the area.

Britt, which was once a proper town with only a post office and a carpet store, has evolved into a large community that spans an extended area.  It is generally considered the inhabited area north of the city of Virginia, and north-northwest of Wuori Township.  The area begins at Highway 169 (MN 169) near Florenton and goes west past U.S. Highway 53 near Sand Lake.  However, Britt now also covers the unorganized territory of Sand Lake to the west centered on Highway 53 while the area near Highway 169 consists of the northern part of Wouri Township.

Saint Louis County Roads 65 and 68 are located within the Britt area.

Britt is located within the Superior National Forest.

Natural lakes in Britt include Lake Fourteen, Lake Leander, Lake Little Fourteen, Dark Lake, Arrowhead Lake, Sand Lake, Little Sand Lake, Sandy Lake, Little Sandy Lake, Moose Lake, Clear Lake, and a number of smaller lakes. Minntac Tailings Basin Cell One also lies partially in southern Britt.

References

 Rand McNally Road Atlas – 2007 edition – Minnesota entry
 Official State of Minnesota Highway Map – 2011/2012 edition

Unincorporated communities in Minnesota
Unincorporated communities in St. Louis County, Minnesota